The 2013 Bank of Beijing China Open was a professional ranking snooker tournament that took place between 25 and 31 March 2013 at the Beijing University Students' Gymnasium in Beijing, China. It was the tenth ranking event of the 2012–13 season.

Peter Ebdon was the defending champion, but he lost 3–5 against Marcus Campbell in the last 32.

Mark Selby attempted a maximum break in his last 32 match against Mark King, but missed the final black at 140. Thus he became the fourth player along with Ken Doherty, Barry Pinches and Robin Hull to do so in a professional tournament.

Neil Robertson won his seventh ranking title by defeating Selby 10–6 in the final.

Prize fund
The breakdown of prize money for this year is shown below: 

Winner: £85,000
Runner-up: £35,000
Semi-final: £20,000
Quarter-final: £11,000
Last 16: £7,500
Last 32: £6,000
Last 48: £2,300
Last 64: £1,500

Non-televised highest break: £700
Televised highest break: £3,500
Total: £425,000

Wildcard round
These matches were played in Beijing on 25 and 26 March.

Main draw

Final

Qualifying
These matches took place between 9 and 12 January 2013 at the World Snooker Academy in Sheffield, England.

Century breaks

Qualifying stage centuries

 142, 103  Sean O'Sullivan
 141  Marcus Campbell
 140  Chen Zhe
 130  Michael Holt
 130  Dave Harold
 127  Marco Fu
 126  Tian Pengfei
 122  Aditya Mehta

 115, 114, 102  Anthony McGill
 108  Andy Hicks
 107  Michael Wild
 104, 102  Kurt Maflin
 103  Liang Wenbo
 100  Robbie Williams
 100  Steve Davis

Televised stage centuries

 142, 126, 121  Jimmy Robertson
 140, 125, 116, 111, 104  Mark Selby
 138, 113, 113, 110, 110  Neil Robertson
 137, 124  Shaun Murphy
 136, 108  Mark Williams
 134, 110  Rory McLeod
 134  Stuart Bingham
 133, 102  Stephen Maguire

 131, 102  Jack Lisowski
 129  Mark Allen
 126  Liang Wenbo
 116  John Higgins
 109  Robert Milkins
 108  Barry Hawkins
 105, 101  Michael Holt

References

External links
2013 Bank of Beijing China Open – Pictures by Tai Chengzhe at Facebook

China Open (snooker)
China Open
Open (snooker)
Sports competitions in Beijing